Horst's tree frog (Litoria amboinensis) is a species of frog in the subfamily Pelodryadinae.
It is found in New Guinea.
Its natural habitats are subtropical or tropical moist lowland forests, subtropical or tropical swamps, swamps, freshwater marshes, intermittent freshwater marshes, rural gardens, and heavily degraded former forests.

References

Litoria
Amphibians described in 1883
Taxonomy articles created by Polbot